Renato Gligoroski was born (4 November 1976 in Vienna, Austria) and is currently a UEFA "A" licensed football/soccer coach from the Republic of Macedonia. Apart from his professional coaching license he is also a professional engineer in Austria.

Playing career
As a player, he played professionally in the Austrian Football Second League for VfB Mödling. He also played for other clubs in lower leagues in Austria such as: SC Perchtoldsdorf, L.A. Riverside, Brunn/Geb. SC, ASK Marienthal, SC Ritzing, and Union AC Mauer.

Managerial career

After Gligoroski ended his playing career he took over the coaching position in SC Perchtoldsdorf, where he played during his youth years. Prior to taking the head coach position at SC Perchtoldsdorf, Gligoroski was team manager for the Austria national under-17 football team and head of department for children and youth football/soccer in the Austrian Football Association. During his time at the Austrian Football Association, he visited several conferences and symposiums throughout the world, some of which include: FIFA Women's Football Symposium in 2003, UEFA Grassroots Conference in 2004, and UEFA Futsal Conference in 2005.

References

External links

1976 births
Living people
Footballers from Vienna
Association football midfielders
Macedonian footballers
Austrian footballers
FC Admira Wacker Mödling players
2. Liga (Austria) players
Macedonian football managers
Austrian football managers
FK Austria Wien non-playing staff